The Lake Wales Ridge, sometimes referred to as the Mid-Florida Ridge, is a sand ridge running for about 100 miles south to north in Central Florida. Clearly viewable from satellite, the white sands of the ridge are located in Highlands County and Polk County, and also extend north into Osceola, Orange, and Lake Counties. It is named for the city of Lake Wales, roughly at the midpoint of the ridge. A northern unconnected extension of the Lake Wales Ridge exists in western Putnam County near the town of Grandin.

Origins
Florida's ancient sand islands stretch for over 100 miles down the middle of central Florida.  Glacial changes and the rising and falling of the oceans caused dramatic transformations on the Florida peninsula.  Covered almost completely by water two million years ago, only a series of small islands existed.  It is the remnants of those islands that make up today's Lake Wales Ridge. Although the waters have receded, the islands  continue to support distinctive life forms found nowhere else. Today several communities are located inside the Lake Wales sand ridge, with the glaring white sands visible in many neighborhoods.

Habitat
These relic sand dunes created over thousands of years by the dynamic movements of sea, ice and wind now provide refuge for rare and endangered plants and animals. Although consisting of a variety of habitats from low and wet bayheads to high and dry sandhills, the ridge is most famous for its scrub habitat. Wildlife and plants once isolated on these islands evolved extremely unusual characteristics.  This forest in miniature consists of clusters of shrubs scattered between patches of open sand.  The lack of canopy cover and very deep porous sands create a hot, dry, desert like habitat. Due primarily to a long period of isolation, plants and animals that live on the Ridge have developed ways to deal with their harsh environment.

One of the scrub's best known residents is Florida's only endemic bird, the Florida scrub-jay. When walking through scrub areas, small scrub lizards often race off in the distance — perhaps an adaptation for crossing the hot sand quickly. Many animals of the scrub spend much of their lives underground to escape the hot Florida sun as well as to avoid predators. The gopher tortoise digs a burrow underground that may be up to ten feet deep and up to 30 feet long. More than 360 species may share the gopher's burrow. Other small animals such as the sand skink leave only "S"-shaped tracks as it "swims" just beneath the surface of the sand. It is the only known sand-swimming skink in North America and occurs in only seven counties in Florida.

Most of the vegetation in the Lake Wales Sand Ridge consists of (or has evolved into) scrub plants with thick waxy coated leaves that are drought tolerant. The leaves of the sand live oak are thick and leathery, rolled in at the edges to help retain as much water as possible during the blazing hot days of summer. Species of Opuntia, Yucca, Scrub plum, and scrub Serenoa repens palm dot the landscape and are well adapted to the hot sun and fast draining soils.

In the early twentieth century parts of the ridge were converted to citrus groves. More recently, some of the citrus groves, particularly in the north of the ridge, have been redeveloped for residential housing. Today several areas of the Ridge are protected National Wildlife Refuges and State Forest.

Lake Wales Ridge National Wildlife Refuge

The refuge preserves natural habitat in four separated areas of the ridge. The refuge is not open to the public.

Lake Wales Ridge State Forest

The state forest is located east of Frostproof, and provides hiking trails and other recreational facilities.

References

External links 

Ridges of Florida
Landforms of Polk County, Florida
Landforms of Lake County, Florida
Landforms of Highlands County, Florida
Landforms of Florida
Geography of Florida